Diamond in the Dirt is the second extended play (EP) by English rapper Mist. It was released on 9 February 2018 through Warner Bros. Records and Sickmade Ent. It marks Mist's second full length project following his debut EP M I S to the T in September 2016. It features production from frequent collaborator Steel Banglez, and guest appearances from Nines, Not3s, Jessie Ware and Mostack, among others.

Chart performance 
Diamond in the Dirt entered the UK Album Chart on February 22, 2018, peaking at number 4 and staying on the chart for 6 weeks. Three songs from the EP also entered the UK Singles Chart; "Wish Me Well" featuring Jessie Ware, which peaked at number 73, "On It" featuring Nines, which peaked at number 66, and "Game Changer", which peaked at number 35.

Music videos
3 music videos have been filmed for this project: "Game Changer", "Wish Me Well" and "Moshpit", which can all be found on Mist's YouTube channel.

Track listing
All tracks mixed by Jay Reynolds

Credits adapted from Genius.

References

2018 EPs
Warner Records EPs